Moisés Wille Lupion de Troia (March 25, 1908 — August 29, 1991) was a Brazilian accountant, businessman, and politician who twice served as governor of the state of Paraná.

References

1908 births
1991 deaths
Governors of Paraná (state)
Members of the Federal Senate (Brazil)
Members of the Chamber of Deputies (Brazil)